This is a complete listing of National Basketball Association players who have recorded 22 or more assists in a game.

35 players have recorded 22 or more assists in a game. It has occurred 67 times in the regular season and six times in the playoffs.

John Stockton has performed the feat the most times (13), followed by Kevin Porter (9) and Earvin "Magic" Johnson (8).

See also
NBA regular season records
List of NCAA Division I men's basketball players with 20 or more assists in a game

Notes

References
Sporting News, The (2005). 2005–06 Official NBA Guide.

Assists